Karl Emil Malmelin (16 January 1872 – 26 February 1944) was a Finnish farmworker and mass murderer.

Malmelin was born 1872 in Espoo as the illegitimate child of Helena Gustava Malmelin, a maid at a Lahnus croft. As an adult, Malmelin became a farmworker at the Simola croft in Klaukkala, a village in the southern part of the Nurmijärvi municipality. The tenant there was Johan Ezekiel Aspelin. Malmelin began dating Edla, the crofter's daughter, but when she would not become his wife, he killed everyone on the croft with an axe on 10 May 1899. Three of the victims were women and two were children. Malmelin was arrested a couple of weeks later.

Malmelin was sentenced to life imprisonment by the Turku Court of Appeal. The case was the subject of a broadside ballad, and Nurmijärvi parish became popularly known as Murhajärvi (which literally means "murder lake"). Malmelin served 13 years of his sentence before being pardoned by Nicholas II in 1912. The later events of Malmelin's life remain unknown.

Malmelin remains one of the worst axe murderers in Finnish history, along with Toivo Koljonen.

Sources

References

See also 
 List of massacres in Finland
 Axe murder

1872 births
1944 deaths
20th-century Finnish criminals
Finnish male criminals
Finnish mass murderers
Mass murder in 1899
Finnish people convicted of murder
People convicted of murder by Finland
Axe murder
Stabbing attacks in Finland
19th-century murders in Finland